Per Lennart Johansson (born 25 January 1963 in Borlänge, Dalarna) is a former freestyle swimmer from Sweden. He won two individual Olympic bronze medals in the 100 m freestyle in 1980 and 1984. Both in 1981 and 1983 he became European champion. Johansson was nicknamed Senan.

Personal bests

Long course (50 m)

Clubs
Borlänge SS

External links

1963 births
Olympic bronze medalists for Sweden
Swimmers at the 1980 Summer Olympics
Swimmers at the 1984 Summer Olympics
Swimmers at the 1988 Summer Olympics
Living people
Olympic bronze medalists in swimming
Swedish male freestyle swimmers
World Aquatics Championships medalists in swimming
European Aquatics Championships medalists in swimming
Borlänge SS swimmers
Medalists at the 1984 Summer Olympics
Medalists at the 1980 Summer Olympics
Sportspeople from Dalarna County